This is a list of airports in the Dominican Republic, grouped by type and sorted by location.

Airport names shown in bold indicate the airport has scheduled service on commercial airlines.

See also 
 Transportation in the Dominican Republic
 List of the busiest airports in Dominican Republic
 List of airports by ICAO code: M#MD - Dominican Republic
 Wikipedia: WikiProject Aviation/Airline destination lists: North America#Dominican Republic

References

External links 
 Lists of airports in the Dominican Republic:
 FlyDominicanRepublic.com
 Great Circle Mapper
 FallingRain.com
 World Aero Data
 Aircraft Charter World
 The Airport Guide
 A-Z World Airports

 
Dominican Republic
Airports
Airports
Dominican Republic